Hypoponera punctatissima, or Roger's ant, is a species of ant in the family Formicidae.

Subspecies
These three subspecies belong to the species Hypoponera punctatissima:
 Hypoponera punctatissima indifferens (Forel, 1895) i c g
 Hypoponera punctatissima jugata (Forel, 1892) i c g
 Hypoponera punctatissima punctatissima (Roger, 1859) i c g
Data sources: i = ITIS, c = Catalogue of Life, g = GBIF, b = Bugguide.net

References

Further reading

 

Ponerinae
Articles created by Qbugbot
Insects described in 1859
Taxa named by Julius Roger

Hymenoptera of New Zealand
Ants of New Zealand